Xote is a Brazilian music genre and dance with a binary or quaternary rhythm. It is the local equivalent of the German schottische. Xote is a common type of forró dancing.

The word xote is a corruption of the German word schottisch meaning Scottish; the schottische is related to the Scottish polka. The schottische was brought to Brazil by José Maria Toussaint in 1851, and it was a dance popular among the upper classes during the reign of Emperor Pedro II.  Later, black slaves danced their own adaptations of the dance, adding their own influences, converting it into a dance that was more popular and well known. This period was when the style came to be known as xote or xótis.

The xote is a very versatile dance and has a number of local versions, such as the southern version called xote gaúcho. 

The dance may incorporate steps from other Latin American dances, such as salsa, rumba and mambo.

See also
Schottische
Chamamé
Jenkka

References

Brazilian music
Dance in Brazil
Social dance
Square dance
Polka derivatives